Methyl-CpG binding domain protein 5 is a protein that in humans is encoded by the MBD5 gene.

Function 

This gene encodes a member of the methyl-CpG-binding domain (MBD) family. The MBD consists of about 70 residues and is the minimal region required for a methyl-CpG-binding protein binding specifically to methylated DNA. In addition to the MBD domain, this protein contains a PWWP domain (Pro-Trp-Trp-Pro motif), which consists of 100-150 amino acids and is found in numerous proteins that are involved in cell division, growth and differentiation. Mutations in this gene cause an autosomal dominant type of cognitive disability. The encoded protein interacts with the polycomb repressive complex PR-DUB which catalyzes the deubiquitination of a lysine residue of histone 2A. Haploinsufficiency of this gene is associated with a variety of Kleefstra syndrome involving microcephaly, intellectual disabilities, severe speech impairment, and seizures . Alternatively spliced transcript variants have been found, but their full-length nature is not determined. [provided by RefSeq, Jul 2017].

References

Further reading